Justice Weekly was a popular Canadian tabloid magazine that was published weekly from 1946 until 1973. It was based in Toronto, Ontario. It featured news about Canadian and International criminal justice cases and issues concerned with punishment (especially corporal punishment) in institutional and domestic environments.  Copies of all or part are still present in a few libraries.

Justice Weekly also featured considerable erotically-oriented content particularly concerned with discipline and cross-dressing themes of particular interest to fetishism enthusiasts. Several selections of such content have been separately printed  It ceased publication when its publisher retired.

A volume has since been published calling itself a "stylistic but uncensored tribute to the legendary Justice Weekly, which featured some of the best letters ever written on these subjects"

References

Weekly magazines published in Canada
Defunct magazines published in Canada
Legal magazines
Magazines established in 1946
Magazines disestablished in 1973
Magazines published in Toronto
1946 establishments in Ontario
1973 disestablishments in Ontario